Thierry Gerard Audel (born 15 January 1987) is a French footballer who plays as a centre back for Brackley Town. He is the cousin of former French footballer Johan Audel.

He has played in France, Italy and England (also spending a brief time on the books of Slovenian club Izola). A reserve team player at AJ Auxerre, he spent three years at Italian side Triestina from 2007 to 2010, and also played on loan at San Marino, before moving on to Pisa. He moved to England in January 2013 to play for Macclesfield Town, before signing with Crewe Alexandra five months later. During his time at Crewe, Audel had two loan spells at Lincoln City. In February 2015, Audel re-signed for Macclesfield Town, before a summer move to newly relegated Notts County in League Two. In July 2017, Audel joined Barrow, moving to Welling United a year later.

Career
Audel played for the reserves of Auxerre before moving to the Italian Serie B club U.S. Triestina Calcio in 2007 via MNK Izola (a pure transfer trick or allegedly false accounting). He played two Serie B games for Triestina in the 2007–08 season, and spent the 2008–09 season in the Lega Pro Seconda Divisione for San Marino, making 31 appearances.

Audel had an unsuccessful trial at Portsmouth in summer 2009. He moved to A.C. Pisa 1909 of the Lega Pro Prima Divisione in mid-2010. He made eight appearances in the 2010–11 season and played 23 matches in the 2011–12 campaign.

He had a trial with Conference National club Luton Town in December 2012. The following month he signed a deal with Macclesfield Town. He played 20 games for the Silkmen in the latter half of the 2012–13 season, putting in a number of impressive displays. He did, however, give away a penalty in a 1–0 defeat to Premier League side Wigan Athletic at Moss Rose on 26 January after mistiming a tackle on Callum McManaman.

He signed a two-year contract with League One side Crewe Alexandra in June 2013 after manager Steve Davis paid Macclesfield an undisclosed fee. However, he played just five games for the Railwaymen, being sent on two loan spells to Lincoln City, before returning to Macclesfield Town in February 2015. He then played for newly relegated Notts County in League Two for two seasons. In July 2017, Audel joined Barrow, moving to Welling United a year later.

On 27 June 2019, it was confirmed that Audel had joined Brackley Town.

Style of play
Audel is a defender who can play at centre-back and at right-back. His agent described him as a "strong and powerful defender who's good on the ball".

Statistics

Notes

Honours

Welling United
London Senior Cup (1): 2018–19

References

External links

1987 births
Living people
Footballers from Nice
Association football central defenders
Association football fullbacks
French footballers
AJ Auxerre players
French expatriate footballers
Expatriate footballers in Slovenia
MNK Izola players
Expatriate footballers in Italy
U.S. Triestina Calcio 1918 players
A.S.D. Victor San Marino players
Pisa S.C. players
Expatriate footballers in England
Macclesfield Town F.C. players
Crewe Alexandra F.C. players
Lincoln City F.C. players
Notts County F.C. players
Barrow A.F.C. players
Welling United F.C. players
Brackley Town F.C. players
Serie B players
Serie C players
National League (English football) players
English Football League players